Ismaïl Ould Cheikh Ahmed (born 9 November 1960, in Nouakchott) is a Mauritanian diplomat and politician. He served as a United Nations Special Envoy for Yemen and was therefore head of the Office of the Special Envoy of the Secretary-General for Yemen from 25 April 2015 to February 2018.

Prior to that posting, Ahmed served as United Nations Special Representative for the United Nations Mission for Ebola Emergency Response (UNMEER).

Prior to that appointment of 11 December 2014, Ahmed was the Deputy Special Representative and Deputy Head of the United Nations Support Mission in Libya (UNSMIL).

References

Mauritanian officials of the United Nations
1960 births
Living people
People from Nouakchott
Foreign ministers of Mauritania
Special Representatives of the Secretary-General of the United Nations
UN Special Envoys for Yemen